The following highways are numbered 735:

Costa Rica
 National Route 735

United States
Ohio
  Ohio State Route 735
Territories
  Puerto Rico Highway 735